Bluff, previously known as Campbelltown and often referred to as "The Bluff", is a town  and seaport in the Southland region, on the southern coast of the South Island of New Zealand. It is the southernmost town in mainland New Zealand and, despite Slope Point and Stewart Island being further south, Bluff is colloquially used to refer to the southern extremity of the country (particularly in the phrase "from Cape Reinga to The Bluff"). According to the 2018 census, the resident population was 1,797, a decrease of 6 since 2013.

The Bluff area was one of the earliest areas of New Zealand where a European presence became established. The first ship known to have entered the harbour was the Perseverance in 1813, in search of flax trading possibilities, with the first European settlers arriving in 1823 or 1824.

This is the foundation for the claim that Bluff is the oldest permanent European settlement in the country. However, the missionary settlement at Kerikeri was both earlier and larger. The town was officially called Campbelltown in 1856, became a borough in 1878, and was renamed Bluff in 1917.

Geography

This was one of New Zealand's earliest railways, opening on 5 February 1867.

Bluff is at the end of a peninsula that forms the western side of Bluff Harbour and Awarua Bay, with the port located in the relatively narrow entrance channel. It is on State Highway 1, which terminates one kilometre to the south of the town at Stirling Point. At Stirling Point, there is "the town's biggest tourist attraction", a signpost showing the distance and direction to various major cities and locations around the world, including the Equator and the South Pole. (The signpost was corrected in late 2018, after a Scottish tourist pointed out in 2017 that there were some errors.)

Bluff is dominated by Bluff Hill / Motupōhue (standing at ), which provides some shelter from the prevailing westerly winds. There is a path along the shore through native bush up to this point. The town is named for this bluff, which was known to early whalers as Old Man's Bluff or Old Man Bluff. East across the entry channel from Bluff is Tiwai Point, home to New Zealand's only aluminium smelter and its wharf. Alumina is shipped from Australia and electricity is supplied by the Manapouri Power Station in Fiordland National Park.

A chain sculpture on the coast near Bluff symbolises the Māori belief that Stewart Island is anchored to South Island; a similar sculpture in Rakiura National Park represents the other end of the chain.

Demographics

Bluff had a population of 1,797 at the 2018 New Zealand census, a decrease of 6 people (−0.3%) since the 2013 census, and unchanged since the 2006 census. There were 780 households. There were 918 males and 879 females, giving a sex ratio of 1.04 males per female. The median age was 47.3 years (compared with 37.4 years nationally), with 330 people (18.4%) aged under 15 years, 228 (12.7%) aged 15 to 29, 858 (47.7%) aged 30 to 64, and 381 (21.2%) aged 65 or older.

Ethnicities were 77.6% European/Pākehā, 46.4% Māori, 6.2% Pacific peoples, 1.3% Asian, and 1.5% other ethnicities (totals add to more than 100% since people could identify with multiple ethnicities).

The proportion of people born overseas was 6.0%, compared with 27.1% nationally.

Although some people objected to giving their religion, 54.9% had no religion, 32.7% were Christian, 0.2% were Hindu, 0.2% were Muslim, 0.5% were Buddhist and 2.0% had other religions.

Of those at least 15 years old, 102 (7.0%) people had a bachelor or higher degree, and 528 (36.0%) people had no formal qualifications. The median income was $30,500, compared with $31,800 nationally. 189 people (12.9%) earned over $70,000 compared to 17.2% nationally. The employment status of those at least 15 was that 726 (49.5%) people were employed full-time, 228 (15.5%) were part-time, and 45 (3.1%) were unemployed.

Economy

South Port is the port operating company of the Port of Bluff, and is owned to 66.5% by the Southland Regional Council. A small port in comparison with New Zealand giants like Ports of Auckland or Port of Tauranga, it moves around 2.2 million tonnes of cargo each year, mostly New Zealand coastal reshipment. The Tiwai Point aluminium smelter and fossil fuel exploration activity in the Great South Basin may ensure the future relevance of the port. A recent (2008) weekly container ship service also lifted the volumes.

In July 2020, Rio Tinto announced closure of the aluminium smelter in August 2021, after which discussions were initiated on how to utilize the energy generated in Manapouri.

It is the main gateway for New Zealand ships heading down to the Antarctic. The harbour is home to the Foveaux Strait oyster fleet. Bluff oysters are renowned for their succulence and flavour, and are considered a delicacy nationwide, with Bluff holding an annual oyster festival. The oyster quota was severely reduced during the 1990s due to the effects of the toxic protozoan parasite Bonamia exitiosa upon the oyster beds.

Culture

Te Rau Aroha Marae is located at Bluff. It is a marae (meeting ground) for the Awarua Rūnanga branch of Ngāi Tahu, and includes the Tahu Potiki wharenui.

Attractions

The town previously included the Paua House, created by Fred and Myrtle Flutey. This was an ordinary bungalow transformed by having the outside walls totally covered in paua shells. The interior was also extensively decorated with paua and there is an extensive collection of (often kitsch) paua-decorated ornaments, utensils and trinkets.

The house became a museum after the death of the owners, but was sold and in March 2007 the exhibits removed to Christchurch. It has been on permanent display at the Canterbury Museum since July 2008.

The Bluff Maritime Museum contains an extensive collection of models, boats, artefacts, displays, a working triple expansion engine and a full sized oystering boat, the Monica.

Education
Bluff School is a state full primary school serving years 1 to 8 with a roll of  students as of  The school opened in 1867.

St Teresa's School is a state-integrated Catholic school serving years 1 to 8 with a roll of  students.

Notable people

 Hannah Ward Barron (1829–1898), successful businesswoman and hotel proprietor  
Thomas Francis Doyle (1893–1968), member of the New Zealand Legislative Council
 Sir Joseph George Ward (1856–1930), Mayor of Campbelltown, Chair Bluff Harbour Board, founder J.G.Ward and Co, MP for Awarua 1887–1919 and for Invercargill 1925–1930, Prime Minister of New Zealand 1906–1912 and 1928–30.
Dorothy May De Lany (1908–1970), first woman president of a trade union in New Zealand

See also
 Ocean Beach (Bluff Harbour)

References

External links

Bluff (from Bluff Promotions)
Bluff in the 1966 Encyclopaedia of New Zealand
World History of Bluff

 
Port cities in New Zealand
Populated places in Southland, New Zealand